The Royal Palace is the official residence of the Karađorđević royal family. The Royal Palace was built between 1924 and 1929 with the private funds of His Majesty King Alexander I (the grandfather of HRH Crown Prince Alexander). It is the main building in the Royal Compound, part of the Dedinje neighbourhood of Belgrade. Designed by Živojin Nikolić and Nikolaj Krasnov, the palace is an example of Serbo-Byzantine Revival architecture.

The Royal Palace is surrounded with pergolas, park terraces, swimming pools, pavilions and platforms. There are magnificent views from the palace towards the ridge of Dedinje Hill, Koshutnjak Forest, Topchider and Avala Mountain.

Today, the palace is home to Crown Prince Alexander, Crown Princess Katherine and Alexander's three sons and one grandson.

Gallery

References

Palaces in Serbia
Royal residences in Serbia
Buildings and structures in Belgrade
Buildings and structures completed in 1929
Karađorđević dynasty
1929 establishments in Serbia
Savski Venac